Doug Lazy (real name Gene Douglas Finley) is an American hip hop and dance music producer and DJ from Washington, D.C.  Lazy scored a number of hip house hits in the late 1980s and early 1990s on the Hot Dance Music/Club Play chart, including three #1s: "Let It Roll", "Let the Rhythm Pump", and "H.O.U.S.E.".  In 1990, Ben E. King and Bo Diddley featuring  Lazy recorded a rap version of the Monotones' 1958 hit song "Book of Love" for the soundtrack of the movie, Book of Love.

Discography

Albums
Doug Lazy Gettin' Crazy (1990), Atlantic Records

Singles
"Let It Roll" (1989), Atlantic Records ^
"Let the Rhythm Pump" (1989), Atlantic Records
"Can't Hold Back (U No)" (1990), Atlantic Records
"Can't Get Enough" (1990), ZYX Records
"H.O.U.S.E." (1990), Atlantic Records
"Din Daa Daa's Doin It" (1991), Cardiac Records
"Ride on the Rhythm" (1991), Atlantic Records ^^

^Credited to Raze presents Doug Lazy

^^Credited to Little Louie & Marc Anthony

See also
List of number-one dance hits (United States)
List of artists who reached number one on the US Dance chart

References

Year of birth missing (living people)
Living people
African-American musicians
American dance musicians
Atlantic Records artists
American house musicians
Hip house musicians
21st-century African-American people
Electronic dance music DJs